Washington had seven members of the House.

See also 
 1960 United States House of Representatives elections
 List of United States representatives from Washington

Notes

References 

Washington
1960
1960 Washington (state) elections